Judy Canty is the name of

 Judy Canty (long jumper) (1931–2016), Australian long jumper
 Judy Peckham (née Canty; born 1950), Australian sprinter and middle-distance runner